The Sanni (Georgian: სანები) were an ancient western Georgian tribe.

Sanni is also a Finnish common given name and family name. It may refer to:

Persons
Given name
Sanni Kurkisuo, (born 1993), Finnish singer, songwriter, and actress, better known by the mononym Sanni
Sanni Leinonen, (born 1989), Finnish alpine skier
Sanni Utriainen (born 1991), Finnish javelin thrower

Last name
Domingo Maria Sanni (18th century), Italian painter and architect of the late Baroque period, active in Spain
Olayinka Sanni (born 1986), American professional basketball player

Various
"Sanni", song by Finnish rock band Ripsipiirakka from their 2003 album Punkstars
Sanni Yakuma, sometimes known as Daha ata sanniya, traditional Sinhalese exorcism ritual